The 2004 Marshall Thundering Herd football team represented Marshall University in National Collegiate Athletic Association (NCAA) Division I –A college football during the 2004 NCAA Division I-A football season. Marshall competed as a member of the East Division of Mid-American Conference, and played their home games at Joan C. Edwards Stadium. They were coached by Bob Pruett, who would retire from coaching at the end of the season.

Schedule

References

Marshall
Marshall Thundering Herd football seasons
Marshall Thundering Herd football